The Brabham BT59 was a Formula One racing car designed by Sergio Rinland and Hans Fouche for the Brabham team which raced in the  and  Formula One World Championships.

1990 
The team's cars were driven by Australian David Brabham, the youngest son of team founder Sir Jack Brabham, and one of the team's  drivers, Italian Stefano Modena. The car was powered by the Judd V8 engine and ran on Pirelli tyres.

After a promising first half of the 1989 season which saw Modena finish 3rd in Monaco, Brabham began to fall back down the grid. Lack of money and lack of power from the Judd V8 as well as inferior Pirelli rubber not helping the team in their quest to return to the top of Formula One. The best result achieved in 1990 was a seventh place at the Canadian Grand Prix driven by Modena.

1991 
For the 1991 season, the car was dubbed BT59Y and fitted with a Yamaha OX99 V12 engine.  Driven by British drivers Martin Brundle and Mark Blundell, the BT59Y was used only in the first two races and then replaced by the Brabham BT60Y.

Complete Formula One results
(key)

* All points scored with the BT58

References 

Brabham Formula One cars
1990 Formula One season cars
1991 Formula One season cars